William Marshall Butler (born August 4, 1947) is a former American football linebacker. 

Butler was born in Los Angeles in 1947. He played college football at Pierce College (1966-1967) and Valley State College (1968-1969), both located in the San Fernando Valley. He was a Junior College All-American at Pierce and won All California Collegiate Association honors in 1969.

In February 1970, Butler signed a professional football contract with the Denver Broncos of the National Football League (NFL). He appeared in a total of 14 NFL games for the Broncos.

References

1947 births
Living people
American football linebackers
Denver Broncos players
Cal State Northridge Matadors football players
People from Reseda, Los Angeles
Players of American football from Los Angeles